Merchants, Dealers & Slaves (abbreviated as M, D & S) is the third studio album by Nigerian singer Brymo. It was made available for purchase as a digital download on October 20, 2013, and was released six days after Chocolate City filed an interim injunction against Brymo. The album was produced entirely by Mikky Me and features guitar work from David. It was supported by the singles "Down" and "Eko". Physical copies of the album were not allowed to circulate as a result of the injunction. The album's physical release was issued on March 26, 2014, a few days after the injunction was lifted.

Background and contractual issues
Brymo recorded M, D & S in 2013. He enlisted Mikky Me to produce it entirely and worked with guitarist David to compose "Money". While recording M, D & S, Brymo announced on Twitter he parted ways with Chocolate City. His announcement was quickly refuted by Audu Maikori, the CEO of Chocolate City at the time. In August 2013, Brymo signed a distribution deal with Spinlet, enabling the digital media company to distribute M, D & S online. In October 2013, Spinlet discontinued the deal after Chocolate City made them aware of its existing contract with Brymo.

On 14 October 2013, Chocolate City filed an interim injunction against Brymo, restraining him from partaking in musical ventures beyond the confines of his contract. On October 20, 2013, Brymo released the album despite reports about an injunction. He revealed the track list for the album two days prior to releasing it.  The following day, Brymo was restrained from releasing and distributing any musical work, pending Chocolate City's lawsuit against him. In March 2014, the Federal High Court of Lagos lifted the restraint it put on Brymo.

Composition
M, D & S opens with "Truthfully", a slow tempo ballad that tackles themes of love and devotion. The reflective afrobeat-inspired track "Grand Pa" talks about a troubling grandfather with misplaced priorities. "Down" is a metaphor for the current political climate in Nigeria; the song addresses corruption and other problems plaguing Nigeria. The carefully crafted "Eko" has been described as a "chronicle of Brymo's arrival in Lagos". The reggae-tinged "Everyone Gets to Die" talks about the fickleness of life. "Purple Jar" has been described as a "poetic song that speaks of hurt". In the Yoruba ballad "Se Bo'timo", Brymo talks about one being deceived by people closest to them.

Singles
The album's lead single "Down" was officially released on October 1, 2013. Its music video was uploaded to YouTube on September 30, 2013. Brymo dedicated the song to his family and country. According to a report by Nigerian Entertainment Today, undergraduate students at Southern Illinois University Carbondale did a lyrical decomposition of "Down" as part of their case study project. Brymo was invited to the school to attend the case study presentation. On October 21, 2013, "Eko" was released as the album's second single.

Critical reception

Merchants, Dealers, & Slaves received positive reviews from music critics. Yetunde Ogunleye, writing a review for Jaguda.com, described the album as a spiritual experience and called it "genuinely beautiful, classic and progressive". Reviewing for YNaija, Wilfred Okichie comments, "M, D & S is a near masterpiece, the kind of album you listen to and place the artiste at the top of your classics list. You want more immediately but music like this takes a while to come around so you contend yourself with repeat listens". Serubiri Moses of Bakwa magazine described the album as the "coming of age album for Brymo" and said it is "equally an impressionistic take on the historical injustices in Lagos".

In a review for Nigerian Entertainment Today, Ayomide Tayo praised Brymo's vocal performance and described the album as a "soulful masterpiece that is emotionally charged with amazing production". Fab magazine called M, D & S a fusion of "Yoruba adages, current Nigerian situations and passion". Ogaga Sakpaide of TooXclusive rated the album four-and-a-half stars out of five, applauding Brymo for delivering an "emotional, mysterious and poetic masterpiece that will stand the test of time". Obi Ejiogu from YNaija said the album "feels evocative of a different time and place, one far removed from the influences of current music industry trends".

Track listing

Release history

References

2013 albums
Brymo albums
Yoruba-language albums